John Rylett Salew (1902 (some sources state 1 January 1897)14 September 1961) was an English stage film and TV actor. Salew made the transition from stage to films in 1939, and according to Allmovie, "the manpower shortage during WWII enabled the stout, balding Salew to play larger and more important roles than would have been his lot in other circumstances. He usually played suspicious-looking characters, often Germanic in origin." His screen roles included William Shakespeare in the comic fantasy Time Flies (1944), Grimstone in the Gothic melodrama Uncle Silas (1947), and the librarian in the supernatural thriller Night of the Demon (1957). He played Colonel Wentzel in the Adventures of William Tell "The Shrew" episode (1958). 
John Salew was active into the TV era, playing the sort of character parts that John McGiver played in the US

Selected filmography

 It's in the Air (1938) – RAF Radio Operator (uncredited)
 Dead Men are Dangerous (1939) – Tramp (uncredited)
 The Silent Battle (1939) – Ernest
 The Chinese Bungalow (1940) – Mr. Lum
 Pastor Hall (1940)
 A Window in London (1940) – Reporter
 The Thief of Bagdad (1940) – Fish Peddler (uncredited)
 Neutral Port (1940) – Wilson
 Sailors Don't Care (1940) – Henri
 The Farmer's Wife (1941) – Mr. Rundle
 Inspector Hornleigh Goes To It (1941) – Mr. Tomboy
 Turned Out Nice Again (1941) – Largos
 Once a Crook (1941) – Solicitor
 Atlantic Ferry (1941) – Henry
 Back-Room Boy (1942) – Steve Mason
 One of Our Aircraft Is Missing (1942) – German Sentry
 Suspected Person (1942) – Jones
 The Day Will Dawn (1942) – "Man-in-the-Street" in Fleet Street Pub
 The Young Mr. Pitt  (1942) – Smith
 Secret Mission (1942) – Hauptmann Gruening
 Squadron Leader X (1943) – Sentry at Madame Berthelot's (uncredited)
 Tomorrow We Live (1943) – Marcel LaBlanc
 We Dive at Dawn (1943) – Drake (uncredited)
 The Bells Go Down (1943) – Landlord (uncredited)
 Warn That Man (1943) – Wilson
 The Saint Meets the Tiger (1943) – Merridon (curator of the Baycome Museum)
 Millions Like Us (1943) – The Doctor
 The Adventures of Tartu (1943) – Heinrich Müller (uncredited)
 The Night Invader (1943) – Witsen
 The Hundred Pound Window (1944) – Walker
 Tawny Pipit (1944) – Pickering
 Time Flies (1944) – William Shakespeare
 The Way Ahead (1944) – Sam – Friend of Pvt Lloyd in Pub Scene (uncredited)
 Give Us the Moon (1944) – (uncredited)
 Don't Take It to Heart (1944) – Dr. Rose, witness
 Candles at Nine (1944) – Griggs – Everard's Butler
 Murder in Reverse? (1945) – Blake King's Counsel
 The Rake's Progress (1945) – Burgess
 Caravan (1946) – Diego
 Beware of Pity (1946) – Col. Franz Bubencic
 Wanted for Murder (1946) – Det. Walters
 I See a Dark Stranger (1946) – Man in Bookshop
 Bedelia (1946) – Alec Johnstone
 A Girl in a Million (1946) – Jenkins
 Meet Me at Dawn (1947) – 2nd Client
 The Life and Adventures of Nicholas Nickleby (1947) – Mr. Lillyrick
 Dancing with Crime (1947) – Pogson (uncredited)
 The October Man (1947) – Ticket Inspector
 Uncle Silas (1947) – Grimstone
 It Always Rains on Sunday (1947) – Caleb Neesley
 Anna Karenina (1948) – Lawyer
 My Brother Jonathan (1948) – Wilburn
 Counterblast (1948) – Padre Latham
 Bond Street (1948) – Coles
 London Belongs to Me (1948) – Mr. Barks
 Noose (1948) – Greasy Anderson
 Quartet (1948) – John Coleman, critic (segment "The Colonel's Lady")
 It's Hard to Be Good (1948) – Committee Man (uncredited)
 Brass Monkey (1948) – Captain
 Marry Me! (1949) - Charlie (uncredited)
 All Over the Town (1949) – George Sleek
 Cardboard Cavalier (1949) – Smug
 The Bad Lord Byron (1949) – Samuel Rogers
 For Them That Trespass (1949) – Prosecutor Ainsley
 Kind Hearts and Coronets (1949) – Mr. Perkins
 No Way Back (1949) – Sammy Linkman
 Don't Ever Leave Me (1949) – Farlaine's Manager
 Diamond City (1949) – Dr. Woods
 The Spider and the Fly (1949) – Minister's Secretary
 The Twenty Questions Murder Mystery (1950) – John Grimshaw
 The Blue Lamp (1950) – Officious Man (uncredited)
 The Astonished Heart (1950) – Mr. Bowman
 The Lavender Hill Mob (1951) – Parkin
 No Highway in the Sky (1951) – Symes, Gander Inspector (uncredited)
 Hotel Sahara (1951) – American Husband (uncredited)
 Mystery Junction (1951) – John Martin
 Green Grow the Rushes (1951) – Herbert Finch
 Night Was Our Friend (1951) – Mr. Lloyd
 His Excellency (1952) – Fernando
 The Happy Family (1952) – Mr. Granite
 Street Corner (1953) – Embarrassed Nightclub Patron (uncredited)
 Stryker of the Yard (1953)
 Face the Music (1954) – Maxie Margulies
 Father Brown (1954) – Station Sergeant
 Duel in the Jungle (1954) – Clerk – Henderson's Office
 Lease of Life (1954) – A Doctor
 Three Cases of Murder (1955) – Rooke ("The Picture" segment)
 Wicked as They Come (1956) – M.C. Page, Chief Accountant (uncredited)
 It's Great to Be Young (1956) – Routledge, a senior Master
 The Good Companions (1957) – Mr. Joe Brundit
 Night of the Demon (1957) – Librarian
 Rogue's Yarn (1957) – Sam Youles
 The Gypsy and the Gentleman (1958) – Duffin the Butler
 Tread Softly Stranger (1958) – Pawnbroker
 Left Right and Centre (1959) – Centre – Mayor
 The Heart of a Man (1959) – Agent at Bar (uncredited)
 Alive and Kicking (1959) – Solicitor
 The Shakedown (1960) – John Arnold
 Too Hot to Handle (1960) – Moeller
 The Impersonator (1960) – Harry Walker
 Three on a Spree (1961) – Mr. Monkton
 Scotland Yard (1961) - The Never Never Murder- Wilkes
 Maigret (TV) (1961) - The Simple Case - Doctor Paul

References

External links

Year of birth uncertain
1961 deaths
Male actors from Portsmouth
English male film actors
20th-century English male actors